is a Japanese actress. She played the role of Fuka Igasaki (Shiro Ninger) in the 2015 Super Sentai TV series Shuriken Sentai Ninninger.

Biography
In 2014, Yano won the  1st Uniforms Women & Men's Contest modelling competition.

In 2015, Yano acted in her first television role as Fuka Igasaki/Shironinger in the 39th Super Sentai series, Shuriken Sentai Ninninger.

FIlmography

TV series

Films

References

External links
 Official profile at Stardust Promotion 
 

21st-century Japanese actresses
1998 births
Living people
People from Miyazaki Prefecture
Stardust Promotion artists